Grevenbicht is a village in the south-eastern Netherlands. It is located in the municipality of Sittard-Geleen, Limburg, about 8 km north-west of Sittard, on the east bank of the Meuse river.

In 1982, the municipality of Grevenbicht was merged with Born.

Culture 
In Grevenbicht 'goose pulling' is part of the traditional Shrove Tuesday celebrations. From 2013 to 2016, the autism-friendly one-day Bluegrass Beeg festival was held in October, attracting musicians from countries in Europe and around the world. Bluegrass Beeg was organized by Foundation Autism Friendly Limburg.

Notable people
 Rob Bontje, volleyball player (born 1981)
 Ben Koken, racing cyclist (born 1950)
 , lyricist, director, composer and singer (1924–2003)

References

External links
 
Informational website

Populated places in Limburg (Netherlands)
Former municipalities of Limburg (Netherlands)
Sittard-Geleen